General elections were held in the Philippines on November 11, 1941. Incumbent President Manuel Luis Quezon won an unprecedented second partial term as President of the Philippines via a landslide. His running mate, Vice President Sergio Osmeña also won via landslide. The elected officials however, did not serve their terms from 1942 to 1945 due to World War II. In 1943, a Japanese-sponsored Republic was established and appointed José P. Laurel as president. From 1943 to 1945, the Philippines had two presidents. Quezon died in 1944 due to tuberculosis and was replaced by Sergio Osmeña.

Results

President

Vice president

Senate

House of Representatives

See also 
 1st Congress of the Commonwealth of the Philippines
Commission on Elections
 Politics of the Philippines
 Philippine elections

External links 
 The Philippine Presidency Project
 Official website of the Commission on Elections

1941
Election, general
Landslide victories